The Underwater Hockey European Championships is a biennial tournament in underwater hockey organised by the sports global governing body Confédération Mondiale des Activités Subaquatiques (CMAS). The first event was held in the United Kingdom in 1985.

Events summary

Source:

See also
 Underwater Hockey World Championships
 Underwater hockey at the 2019 Southeast Asian Games

References

External links
 CMAS Underwater Hockey European Championships Archive

Underwater hockey
Underwater Hockey
Recurring events with year of establishment missing